Van Hook is a thriving resort community built on the shores of Lake Sakakawea. The town was disbanded in the 1950s with the flooding of Lake Sakakawea and for a very short period of time was classified as a ghost town in the north central United States, located in Van Hook Township in Mountrail County, North Dakota. The original town site was mostly left not flooded when Lake Sakakawea was formed in the 1950s behind Garrison Dam.

The US Government forced all Van Hook residents in the 1950s to give up their homes and move to New Town. The townsite for a short period of time was abandoned. However, since most of the old townsite was never actually flooded by Lake Sakakawea, the townsite and land nearby more recently has been turned into a thriving unincorporated resort community still called Van Hook and with both a summer-only and a year-around permanent populations. Lake Sakakawea's Van Hook Arm gets its name from the town.

History
Van Hook was founded in 1914 as a station on the Soo Line Railroad. It is named after Fred van Hook, who was one of the first to survey the area in 1911. It was incorporated in 1915, and reported a population of 372 in 1930. In fact, the town grew so fast that it earned the nickname "The City of Speed."

When the Garrison Dam was built in the early 1950s, forming Lake Sakakawea, the town's original residents were relocated to New Town, which the government had built to house those displaced by the dam. Residents from Sanish, located in a place which is now usually completely underwater, also moved here. Another new unincorporated village called New Sanish has since reformed on higher dry land to the south of the original flooded Sanish townsite but still near Lake Sakakawea.

The original incorporated Van Hook town's last reported US Census population in 1950 was 380, prior to when everyone was forced to move out by the federal government.

The Van Hook arm of Lake Sakakawea has always been very popular for recreational fishing, boating, and camping. The rebuilt resort town began a building process the 1970s when it became obvious that most of the main townsite did not flood and would never be flooded by the waters of Lake Sakakawea, and some of the original townsite area was initially opened for camping trailers and other similar temporary summer living quarters. This begin a sequence of events in which year-round homes were eventually not only permitted but encouraged—leading eventually to the present town and the year-round Van Hook community.  The present town continues to add residential areas to the north of the original townsite, and a secondary community of permanent homes a short distance to the north and west of the main townsite has also developed.

The precise current population of the unincorporated resort area/town or "new" Van Hook is not known, but in the summer with temporary residents might easily exceed the 1950 census number of 380. There are plans to get a population count of the current town(s) called Van Hook in the 2020 US Census.

Education
There was previously a school in Van Hook, of the New Town School District.

References

External links
Ghosttowns.com entry for Van Hook, North Dakota Be aware that most of the information on this site that labels Van Hook North Dakota as an uninhabited ghost town and underwater is inaccurate and completely outdated.
Shell highway map of North Dakota – 1940s

Former municipalities in North Dakota
Populated places established in 1914
Populated places disestablished in 1953
1914 establishments in North Dakota
1953 disestablishments in the United States
Mandan, Hidatsa, and Arikara Nation
Populated places in Mountrail County, North Dakota